The TigerShark XP is an unmanned aerial vehicle developed by Navmar Applied Sciences Corporation.

Specifications
 Wingspan of 22 feet
 Gross Weight 515lbs.
 Payload Capacity of 100lbs.
 Flight Duration 10 hours.
 Engine 32 Hp Herbrandson 372cc two stroke.
 Autopilot Fully Autonomous Piccolo II

References

Unmanned aerial vehicles of the United States
Unmanned military aircraft of the United States
Single-engined pusher aircraft
Twin-boom aircraft